Józef Pazdur (22 November 1924 – 7 May 2015) was a Polish Catholic bishop.

Ordained to the priesthood in 1951, Pazdur was appointed auxiliary bishop of the Roman Catholic Archdiocese of Wrocław, Poland, in 1984, and retired in 2000.

Notes

1924 births
2015 deaths
20th-century Roman Catholic bishops in Poland
Polish Roman Catholic bishops